Zborów may refer to:

Zborów, Kalisz County, in Greater Poland Voivodeship, west-central Poland
Zborów, Łódź Voivodeship, central Poland
Zborów, Świętokrzyskie Voivodeship, south-central Poland
Zborów, Turek County, in Greater Poland Voivodeship, west-central Poland
Zboriv, Ukraine, formerly part of Poland under the name Zborów

See also
 Zborov (disambiguation)